Charles Coleman Finlay (born July 1, 1964 in New York City, NY) is an American science fiction and fantasy author and editor.

He grew up in Marysville, Ohio and attended Ohio State University. His first story, Footnotes, was published in 2001 in Fantasy and Science Fiction where many of his stories have since been published. He has published four novels and a short story collection. His fiction has been nominated for the Hugo Award for Best Novella, the Nebula Award for Best Novella, and the Sidewise Award, and in 2003 he was a finalist for the John W. Campbell Award for Best New Writer. He also wrote chapters for the "hoax-novel" Atlanta Nights.

Finlay guest edited the July/August 2014 issue of The Magazine of Fantasy & Science Fiction. In January 2015, Finlay was named the 9th editor of The Magazine of Fantasy and Science Fiction and served in that role until the January/February 2021 issue. In 2021, he won a World Fantasy Award for his work editing the magazine. 

He is married to the fantasy writer Rae Carson.

Bibliography

Novels

 The Prodigal Troll (Pyr, 2005)
 Traitor to the Crown Book 1: The Patriot Witch as C. C. Finlay (Del Rey, 2009)
 Traitor to the Crown Book 2: A Spell for the Revolution as C. C. Finlay (Del Rey, 2009)
 Traitor to the Crown Book 3: The Demon Redcoat as C. C. Finlay (Del Rey, 2009)

In translation
 Der verlorene Troll (2007), 
 Prigioniero politico (2010),

Short fiction 
Collections
 Wild Things (Subterranean, 2005)
Stories

 "Pervert" 2005 Gaylactic Spectrum Award finalist (short form)
 "We Come Not to Praise Washington" 2002 Sidewise Award finalist (short form)
 "The Political Officer", finalist for Best Novella of 2002, and 2003 Hugo Award finalist for Best Novella

Editorials

Interviews

Awards

 2021, World Fantasy Award for Special Award, Professional for editing F&SF

References

External links
 
Charles Coleman Finlay at the Internet Speculative Fiction Database (isfdb.org)
Witchcraft and Revolution: A Profile of C. C. Finlay at Publishers Weekly (2009)

  (mainly previous page of browse report under 'Finlay, C. C.')

1964 births
Living people
21st-century American male writers
21st-century American novelists
21st-century American short story writers
Alumni of the University of Oxford
American male novelists
American male short story writers
American science fiction writers
Analog Science Fiction and Fact people
The Magazine of Fantasy & Science Fiction people
Novelists from Ohio
Ohio State University alumni
People from New York City
People from Marysville, Ohio